The Fujinon XF 60mm F2.4 R Macro is an interchangeable camera lens announced by Fujifilm on January 9, 2012. It is not a true macro lens, with magnification up to 1:2 rather than 1:1. As of July 2015, it is the only lens marketed for close-up work among Fujifilm's X mount offerings. However, Zeiss offers the Touit Makro-Planar T* 50mm f/2.8, which offers 1:1 magnification.

References

60
Camera lenses introduced in 2012